Litchfield Bears Rugby League Club is an Australian rugby league football club based in Litchfield, Northern Territory formed in 1990. They conduct teams for both Juniors & Seniors teams.

Notable  Juniors
Zak Johnston, Tiah Young, Brock Casey, Blake Rupe, Luke Luchetti, Zac Morgan,
Niki Paterson (Brumbies Super W)

See also

Rugby league in the Northern Territory

References

External links
Litchfield Bears Fox Sports pulse
Litchfield Bears Official Site

Sport in Darwin, Northern Territory
Rugby league teams in the Northern Territory
Rugby clubs established in 1990
1990 establishments in Australia